The Adagio in E major for Violin and Orchestra, K. 261, was composed by Wolfgang Amadeus Mozart in 1776. It was probably a replacement movement for the original slow movement of his Violin Concerto No. 5 in A. It is believed that Mozart wrote it specifically for the violinist Antonio Brunetti, who complained that the original slow movement was "too artificial." The work is scored for solo violin, two flutes, two horns and strings.

It is one of the few compositions Mozart wrote in the key of E major: Piano Trio No. 4, K. 542; the incomplete Horn Concerto, K. 494a; the incomplete fugue, Anh. C27.10.

Notes

External links

, Arthur Grumiaux, New Philharmonia Orchestra, Raymond Leppard, 1967

Violin concertos by Wolfgang Amadeus Mozart
Compositions in E major
1776 compositions